Zacatillo, un lugar en tu corazón (English title: Zacatillo, A New Beginning) is a Mexican telenovela produced by Lucero Suárez for Televisa. It aired on Canal de las Estrellas from February 1, 2010 to July 30, 2010.

Ingrid Martz and Jorge Aravena starred as protagonists, while Laura Zapata and Carmen Becerra starred as antagonists. Patricia Navidad, Arath de la Torre, Mariana Karr, Alejandro Ibarra and Arleth Terán starred as stellar performances.

In the United States, Univision aired Zacatillo from May 10, 2011 to October 17, 2011.

Synopsis
Karla (Ingrid Martz) is an actress and singer, who decides to rest from show business after her concert at Zacatillo. Her agent ordered to have her killed. Everyone believes she is dead, but she takes refuge in Zacatillo, where she once found love and may find love again but with a different man. Her manager arranged for her to be dragged and thrown into the sea.

Cast
Ingrid Martz as Karla Abreu Campos de Zárate/Sara Villegas, a singer and actress, cousin of Sara, in love with Gabriel
Jorge Aravena as Gabriel Zárate de Moreno, son of Martha, nephew of Zorayda and Abundio, cousin of Eli, in love with Karla but married with Adriana
Laura Zapata as Doña Miriam Solórzano de Gálvez, aunt and lover of Fernando, Karla's enemy-Antagonist
Patricia Navidad as Zorayda Dumont de Zarate "La Primera Dama", wife of Abundio,aunt of Gabriel, and mother of Eli 
Héctor Ortega – Don Abundio Zarate, father of Eli, uncle of Gabriel, brother of Martha and husband of Zorayda
Carmen Becerra as Adriana "La Noviecita" Pérez-Cotapo Echevarría, daughter of Rosa, Marcela's friend, lover of Julio, wife of Gabriel-Antagonist
Alejandro Ibarra as Alejandro Sandoval, friend of Gabriel, in love with Karla- Antagonist
Maria Alicia Delgado as Alicia "Lichita" López y López, sister of Pepita.
Beatriz Moreno as Josefa "Pepita, La Solterona" López y López de Boturinico, sister of Lichita
Mike Biaggio as Fernando Gálvez, Miriam's lover
Arath de la Torre as Carretino Carretas/Gino Capuccino, husband of Tencha
Benjamin Rivero as Gustavo Velez - Antagonist 
Arleth Terán as Hortensia "Tencha" Guzmán de Carretas, wife of Carretino
Isaura Espinoza as Belarmina
Polo Monarrez as "Cruz Cruz Cruz"
Daniela Torres as Nora
Gaby Mellado as Guadalupe "Lupita" Treviño
Raquel Morell as Carmen
Mariana Karr as Doña Rosa Echvarría Vda. de Pérez-Cotapo, mother of Adriana.
Christina Pastor as Sara Villegas Campos, cousin of Karla.
Bibelot Mansur as Gudelia
Liz Vega as Olga
Emilia Carranza as Martha Moreno Vda. de Zárate, mother of Gabriel and sister of Abundio
Sharis Cid as Paulina Torres
Yago Muñoz as Elisandro "Eli" de Jesus Zarate Dumont, son of Zorayda and Abundio, cousin of Gabriel
Sheyla as Cleodomira Rivadeneira "La Chata"
Agustin Arana as Santiago
Raquel Pankowsky as Sonia
Rubén Cerda as Padre Nemesto
José Carlos Femat as Alan Landeta
Alejandro Nones as Julio
Juan Peláez as Augusto Cienfuegos
Mario Sauret as Don Tomás
Eric Prats as " psiquiatra"
Xavo Kno as Paco
Jorge Ortin as Porfirio/Zeferino
Polo Ortin as Zeferino
Alicia Fhar as Roxana
Lorelí as Vanessa
Begona Narvaez as Marissa
Priscila Avellaneda as Marcela
Susy-Lu Peña as Natalia
Daniela Zavala as Paloma
Polly as Chabela
Jorge Gallegos as Marlon
Jesús Briones as Braulio
Thelma Dorantes as Pancracia
René Mussi as Camilo
Angeles Balvanera as Cora
Patricia Reyes Spindola as Fredesvinda Carretas, aunt of Carretino and Tencha.
Gabriela Mellado as Liliana "Lily" Treviño
Haydee Navarra as Patricia Soria
Gloria Sierra as Ximena
Manuel "Flaco" Ibáñez as Profundo Isimo
Beatriz Shantal as Rebeca
María Prado as "la bruja"
Lalo Zayas as Mauro
Norma Iturbe as Nurse
Paola Flores as Paula

Awards

TVyNovelas Awards

Califa de Oro Awards

TV Adicto Golden Awards

References

External links 
 
 Sitio oficial de Zacatillo
 Últimas semanas de la telenovela Zacatillo, un lugar en tu corazón

2010 telenovelas
2010 Mexican television series debuts
2010 Mexican television series endings
Spanish-language telenovelas
Television shows set in Mexico City
Mexican telenovelas
Televisa telenovelas